Mordellistena annuliventris is a beetle in the genus Mordellistena of the family Mordellidae. It was described in 1886 by Quedenfeldt.

References

annuliventris
Beetles described in 1886